Paucihalobacter is a Gram-negative, strictly aerobic, rod-shaped and non-motile genus of bacteria from the family of Flavobacteriaceae with one known species (Paucihalobacter ruber). Paucihalobacter ruber has been isolated from sediments from the bottom of the Chaiwopu Lake.

References

Flavobacteria
Bacteria genera
Monotypic bacteria genera
Taxa described in 2020